Victor Roe Eaton (born January 3, 1933) is a former American football player who played for Pittsburgh Steelers of the National Football League (NFL). He played college football at the University of Missouri.

In 2011, Eaton was inducted into the Missouri Sports Hall of Fame.

References

1933 births
Living people
Players of American football from Missouri
American football quarterbacks
Pittsburgh Steelers players
Missouri Tigers football players
People from Savannah, Missouri